Nainital Yacht Club is a yacht club that was founded in 1910 by the British, and is located at the Boat House Club in Nainital, a hill station in  India.

History

The earliest records of sailing on Nainital Lake are from 1880, when lead keels Cutter type yachts were used. In 1897, Nainital Sailing Club was established and the "Sorceress" type of yachts were used for many years. The Nainital Yacht Club was founded in 1910 by the Carey brothers: C. W. Carey, a Major in the Corps of Guides, and F. Carey, a captain in the Royal Artillery. The brothers introduced one-design sailing and yachts, and Linton Hope designed many of the new yachts. Known as "Linton Hope Half-Raters", they were specially designed to suit the wind conditions on the Nainital Lake, and apart from India are only found in the Royal Norfolk and Suffolk Yacht Club in England.

Boat House Club
The Boat House Club manages the affairs of Nainital Yacht Club and was founded two decades prior in 1890. It was controlled by the British until 1948, when it passed into the hands of Indian management. The last British commodore was Sir Francis Verner Wylie. The first Indian commodore, Raj Kumar Giriraj Singh, was appointed in 1957. Yachting on the lake was reserved for members till 1970, but today non-members and tourists can sail for a fee. The Boat House Club hosts a Summer Regatta in June every year.

Nainital Regatta
After the British left India, sailing declined in the region. To encourage yacht sailing and boost water sports tourism, the Governor of Uttarakhand in 2014 launched, after a gap of four decades, the Governor's Gold Cup Sailing Regatta, an annual three-day event where sailors from across India compete in the races.

References

Bibliography

External links

1910 establishments in British India
Yacht clubs in India
Buildings and structures in Uttarakhand
Sports clubs in India
Nainital
Sport in Nainital
Sports organizations established in 1910